The Tuggeranong Vikings are a rugby union club based in Tuggeranong, Australian Capital Territory. It is supported by 4 licensed clubs based in Wanniassa, Greenway, Conder, Chisholm. The club has been successful in local and national competitions.

The Tuggeranong Vikings were the premiers of the ACTRU Premier Division competition in the 2009 season, defeating the Queanbeyan Whites.

Notable players
Justin Harrison - 34 Test Caps for Australia
Christian Lealiifano - 101 Caps for the ACT Brumbies. 16 Test Caps for Australia
Joe Roff - 82 Caps for the ACT Brumbies. 86 Test Caps for Australia
Julian Salvi - 63 Caps for the ACT Brumbies & reserve for the Australia from 2005-2007.
Tyrel Lomax - 13 Caps for the Melbourne Rebels, 15 Caps for the Highlanders and 1 Test Cap for the All Blacks

Note - Players highlighted in Bold have not yet retired.

See also

ACTRU Premier Division

References

External links
 Official website

Rugby union teams in the Australian Capital Territory
Rugby clubs established in 1973
1973 establishments in Australia